Austroblechnum lanceolatum, synonym Blechnum chambersii, is a species of fern within the family Blechnaceae, found in Australia, New Zealand, Samoa and Fiji.

A. lanceolatum is commonly called lance water fern, and in New Zealand it is also referred to by its Māori names, nini and rereti.

Distribution
A. lanceolatum is found in the southeast of Australia as well as on Samoa, Fiji and on the North Island of New Zealand and in many of the coastal forests of South Island of New Zealand.

It is the host species for the New Zealand endemic moth Batrachedra litterata.

References

Blechnaceae
Ferns of Australasia
Ferns of Oceania
Ferns of New Zealand
Ferns of Australia
Flora of Fiji
Flora of New South Wales
Flora of Samoa
Flora of American Samoa
Flora of South Australia
Flora of Victoria (Australia)
Flora of Tasmania
Plants described in 1810
Flora without expected TNC conservation status